Shehab El-Deen Mohamed (born March 10, 1989) is an Egyptian professional footballer who currently plays as a left back for the Egyptian club El Raja SC.

He played in the Egyptian Premier League for both Wadi Degla SC and Ghazl El Mahalla SC, making nine appearances between 2009 and 2013.

References

External links

 Shehab Mohamed

1989 births
Living people
El Raja SC players
Egyptian footballers
Association football defenders
Wadi Degla SC players
El Dakhleya SC players
Ghazl El Mahalla SC players